Lauriya Assembly constituency is an assembly constituency in Paschim Champaran district in the Indian state of Bihar. It was earlier reserved for scheduled castes.

Lauriya is one of six assembly constituencies in the Valmiki Nagar (Lok Sabha constituency). Since 2008, this assembly constituency is numbered 5 amongst 243 constituencies.

Overview
As per orders of Delimitation of Parliamentary and Assembly constituencies Order, 2008, 5. Lauriya Assembly constituency is composed of the following: Yogapatti community development block; and Siswania, Kataiya, Marahiya Pakari, Mathia, Lauriya, Belwa Lakhanpur, Gobaraura, Bahuarwa, Dhobani Dharampur, Dhamaura, Daniyal Prasauna, Sathi, Singhpur Satawaria, Basantpur and Baswariya Parautola gram panchayats of Lauriya CD Block.

Members of Legislative Assembly

Election results

2020

2015

2010

References

External links
 

Assembly constituencies of Bihar
Politics of West Champaran district